This is a list of churches in Stockholm, the capital of Sweden. The list does not include chapels or minor churches.

Churches in Stockholm County outside Stockholm municipality are listed in two separate lists: List of churches in Uppland and List of churches in Södermanland.

Note: in the list, "Year" denotes the year construction of the church was finished, when it was inaugurated, or the main construction period of the church.

The list

Lists of religious buildings and structures in Sweden
 
Stockholm
Stockholm-related lists